This is a list of celebrities who publicly indicated support for Hillary Clinton in the 2016 United States presidential election.

Those who indicated their support after Hillary Clinton's presumptive nomination on June 11 are denoted with an asterisk.

Screen and stage performers

Sports figures and athletes 

Daniel Negreanu

Media personalities and socialites

Voice artists and musicians

See also 
List of Democrats who opposed the Hillary Clinton 2016 presidential campaign
List of Hillary Clinton 2016 presidential campaign political endorsements
List of Bernie Sanders 2016 presidential campaign endorsements
List of Donald Trump 2016 presidential campaign endorsements
List of Gary Johnson 2016 presidential campaign endorsements
List of Hillary Clinton 2008 presidential campaign endorsements
List of Jill Stein 2016 presidential campaign endorsements
List of Republicans who opposed the Donald Trump 2016 presidential campaign

Notes

References 

Endorsements, non-political
Clinton, Hillary, non-political
Clinton, Hillary, 2016, non-political